Eleanor of Portugal (– 28 August 1231) was a Portuguese infanta, the only daughter of Afonso II of Portugal and Urraca of Castile, Queen of Portugal. Eleanor was Queen of Denmark by marriage to Valdemar the Young, son of Valdemar II, in 1229.

Bishop Gunner of Viborg had first thought of the idea of the marriage, as Eleanor's aunt Berengaria had been Valdemar's stepmother. The wedding took place in Ribe on 24 June 1229, and the next day Eleanor received southern half of the island Funen as a wedding present from her husband. Even though she was junior queen, she was the only queen since her aunt had died eight years prior and her father-in-law had not remarried.

Only two years later Eleanor died in childbirth on the 28 August 1231, and three months later her husband was killed by an accidental shot.

When examining Eleanor's grave in Ringsted Church, it was discovered that her skeleton showed traces of cancer of the bones, which probably was contributory to her death. At the foot piece of Eleanor's grave was a leaden coffin, which contained the bones of a child about 6 months old, already sickly and scrofulous from birth. So Eleanor probably gave birth to a child, who survived her by only six months.

References

|-

1211 births
1231 deaths
Portuguese infantas
Danish royal consorts
House of Burgundy-Portugal
Burials at St. Bendt's Church, Ringsted
Deaths in childbirth
13th-century Portuguese people
13th-century Portuguese women
13th-century Danish people
13th-century Danish women
Daughters of kings